Sir John Henry Thorold, 12th Baronet  ( (9 March 1842 – October 1922) was a British Conservative Party politician.

He was son of Sir John Charles Thorold, 11th Baronet and succeeded him in 1866, inheriting Syston Park.

He was elected at the 1865 general election as a member of parliament (MP) for the borough of Grantham in Lincolnshire, but did not stand again in 1868.

He was appointed High Sheriff of Lincolnshire for 1876–77. and was a Deputy Lieutenant of the county.

He married Hon. Alexandrina Willoughby, daughter of Baron Middleton, on 3 February 1869, and they had five children:
Dorothy Marion Thorold d. 7 April 1958
Aline Thorold d. 27 October 1951
Sir John George Thorold, 13th Bt. b. 2 October 1870, d. 25 December 1951
Captain Henry Cecil Thorold b. 17 November 1871, d. 18 February 1902
Sir James Ernest Thorold, 14th Bt. (b. 27 January 1877, d. 1965); m. 16 December 1902 Katharine Tindal-Atkinson, da. of Rev. W. R. Tindal-Atkinson, and left children including 15th Baronet.

References

External links 
 

1842 births
1922 deaths
Conservative Party (UK) MPs for English constituencies
UK MPs 1865–1868
Baronets in the Baronetage of England
Deputy Lieutenants of Lincolnshire
High Sheriffs of Lincolnshire
Members of Kesteven County Council
Thorold baronets